Louis Campbell-Tipton (November 21, 1877 – May 1, 1921) was an American composer.

Biography
Born in Chicago, Illinois on November 21, 1877, Louis Campbell-Tipton studied in Boston and Leipzig, and was an instructor in theory at the Chicago Musical College from 1900 to 1905. He then moved to Paris. He felt that the prospects for performance of large-scale American works in the United States were bleak, and claimed that he had never wished to sacrifice the energy needed to complete a large work. Even so, at his death a number of pieces for orchestra were found among his manuscripts, as were two operas. During his life he was known mainly for his chamber music; he also taught theory for a time in Chicago. One of his songs, "A Spirit Flower", was recorded by the Swedish tenor Jussi Bjorling.

He died in Paris on May 1, 1921. His last composition was titled "Day's End".

Works
Amongst other compositions, he wrote the following tone poems:
 Beside the Sea. (Op.3 No.1).
 The Sea Shell. (Op.3 No.2).
 Confession. (Op.3. No.3).
 Summertide. (Op.3. No.4).
 Longing. (Op.3. No.5).
 Night Musings. (Op. 3. No. 6).

References

Further reading

1877 births
1921 deaths
American male composers
American composers